The 1982 Trans America Athletic Conference baseball tournament was held at Luther Williams Field on the campus of Mercer University in Macon, Georgia, from April 29 through May 1. This was the fourth tournament championship held by the Trans America Athletic Conference, in its fourth year of existence.  won their first tournament championship and advanced to the 1982 NCAA Division I baseball tournament.

Seeding and format 
The TAAC brought the two division winners and second place team from each division to the tournament. Each division winner played the opposite division runner up in the first round in the four team double elimination tournament. Hardin-Simmons and Northeast Louisiana claimed the West's first and second seeds, respectively, by tiebreaker.

Bracket

All-Tournament Team 
The following players were named to the All-Tournament Team. No MVP was named until 1985.

References 

Tournament
ASUN Conference Baseball Tournament
Trans America Athletic Conference baseball tournament
Trans America Athletic Conference baseball tournament
Trans America Athletic Conference baseball tournament